Mike Hallett (born 6 July 1959) is an English former professional snooker player and commentator.

Career
Hallett was born in Grimsby on 6 July 1959. Having won the national under-16 title in 1975, he turned professional in 1979. His world ranking peaked at number six in 1989–90, after his only ranking tournament victory at the 1989 Hong Kong Open in which he beat Dene O'Kane 9–8.

In a semi-final match against John Parrott in the 1988 Benson & Hedges Masters, he recovered from needing four snookers to win the decider 6–5. However, he lost 9–0 to Steve Davis in the final, the only whitewash in the Masters final.

Three years later, in 1991 he reached the Masters Final again at Wembley where, in the best-of-17-frame match, he surged to a 7–0 lead over Stephen Hendry and missed a pink which would have put him 8–0 ahead. He then moved into an 8–2 lead and needed just the pink and black to clear for the match in the eleventh frame, but missed the shot with the rest. Hendry took that frame and managed to spring a comeback to win the match 9–8. Hallett would go on to win two invitational World Series of Snooker events later in the year, but did not win another professional title after 1991.

Hallett did reach the quarter-finals of the World Championship twice, but never progressed further. His final season on the main tour was in 2004–05, after which he went on to play in the Pontin's International Open Series. During his career he won approximately £920,000.

Hallett has been commentating on Premier League Snooker for Sky Sports, and all major snooker events on Eurosport. At the start of the 2011/12 season Hallett entered the Players Tour Championship and after winning his first two matches against Duane Jones 4-3 and Elliot Slessor also 4–3, he played Ronnie O'Sullivan and managed to take two frames in losing 4–2.

Hallett entered the Q School in 2011, 2014, 2017 and 2020, but on each occasion failed to progress far enough to qualify for the main tour.

In August 2021 the World Snooker Tour tweeted that Hallett was recovering from a stroke.

Performance and rankings timeline

Career finals

Ranking finals: 2 (1 title)

Non-ranking finals: 15 (4 titles)

Pro-am finals: 4 (3 titles)

Team finals: 3 (2 titles)

References

1959 births
Living people
Sportspeople from Grimsby
English snooker players